Stuart Eduardo Gerold van Doten (born 24 December 1989) is a Dutch former footballer.

Club career
A much-travelled leftback, van Doten played for FC Dordrecht Reserves in the 2008-09 season, then had some seasons in Dutch amateur football before moving abroad to play for Maltese outfit Birkirkara. He then had an injury-hit stint in Bulgaria with Etar 1924 before joining Romanian Liga I club FC Universitatea Cluj. He was dismissed by Uni after 5 rounds and moved to Canada to play for Thunder Bay Chill.

After winning the award  Best Defensive Player 2014 In Canada, van Doten joined KFC Witgoor in Belgium in January 2015, but left them two weeks later before even playing one match and moved to Kuwait and signed a deal with Al Sahel Club on 28 January 2015. Due to mistakes in the required documents from Belgium, FIFA blocked the transfer. Van Doten would be eligible to play official games for his new club as from 1 July 2015. 
On 28 October 2016 Toronto FC invited Van Doten for a short trial and a medical test. During the second training session van Doten got tackled from behind and could not proceed the trial. He flew back to The Netherlands and is a free agent.

Personal life
Van Doten is the cousin of former Heerenveen striker Luciano Slagveer.

References

External links
 Chaos van Oman tot Bulgarije: het verhaal van voetballer Stuart van Doten - VICE Sports 
 
 
 Stuart van Doten at Fupa.net

1989 births
Living people
Footballers from Rotterdam
Dutch sportspeople of Surinamese descent
Association football fullbacks
Dutch footballers
FC Dordrecht players
FC Etar 1924 Veliko Tarnovo players
FC Universitatea Cluj players
Thunder Bay Chill players
Houston Dutch Lions players
Eerste Divisie players
First Professional Football League (Bulgaria) players
Liga I players
Dutch expatriate footballers
Expatriate footballers in Bulgaria
Expatriate footballers in Romania
Expatriate soccer players in Canada
Expatriate footballers in Germany
Expatriate soccer players in the United States
Dutch expatriate sportspeople in Bulgaria
Dutch expatriate sportspeople in Romania
Dutch expatriate sportspeople in Canada
Dutch expatriate sportspeople in Germany
Dutch expatriate sportspeople in the United States
Al-Sahel SC (Kuwait) players
Kuwait Premier League players
Dutch expatriate sportspeople in Kuwait
Expatriate footballers in Kuwait